The Book's Covered Bridge, also known as Kaufman Covered Bridge, is a historic wooden covered bridge located at Jackson Township near Blain in Perry County, Pennsylvania. It is a  Burr Truss bridge, constructed in 1884.  It crosses Sherman Creek.

It was listed on the National Register of Historic Places in 1980.

References 

Covered bridges on the National Register of Historic Places in Pennsylvania
Covered bridges in Perry County, Pennsylvania
Bridges completed in 1884
Wooden bridges in Pennsylvania
Bridges in Perry County, Pennsylvania
Tourist attractions in Perry County, Pennsylvania
National Register of Historic Places in Perry County, Pennsylvania
Road bridges on the National Register of Historic Places in Pennsylvania
Burr Truss bridges in the United States
1884 establishments in Pennsylvania